Owen 'Poe' Staples (born Owen Staples, September3, 1866December6, 1949) was a Canadian painter, etcher, pastelist, political cartoonist, author, musician and naturalist.

Early life and training
Staples' family arrived in Hamilton, ON from Stoke-sub-Hamdon, England in 1872.
Abandoned by their father, the family moved to Rochester, NY in 1876. After Staples' mother died in 1881, he was hired as a messenger boy at the Rochester Art Club where he was given the nickname Poe. There he began his art training with Horatio Walker and Harvey Ellis. In 1885, after nine years in the United States, Staples moved to Toronto, ON to study under George Agnew Reid. That same year, he was hired by John Ross Robertson, founder of the Toronto Telegram. Granted a leave of absence by Robertson, Staples moved to Philadelphia in 1886 for two years of study under Thomas Eakins and Thomas Pollock Anshutz at the Pennsylvania Academy of the Fine Arts.

Professional career
From 1888 to 1908, Staples worked for the Telegram as a staff artist, reporter, and political cartoonist, and illustrator for the J. Ross Robertson Collection. The Battle of York is an example from this collection. Thereafter, Staples became a well-known artist, illustrating a number of books, executing commissioned murals, and producing a vast oeuvre of paintings, watercolours and etchings. Robertson also commissioned Staples to paint several large canvases of historical subjects. Seven of these works now hang in Toronto's New City Hall. He continued to write and illustrate numerous articles for the Telegram on various topics.

Possible association with Tom Thomson

In 1905, Tom Thomson came under the influence of his cousin Dr. William Brodie. Brodie was the director of Biology at the Ontario Provincial Museum, the precursor of the Royal Ontario Museum. Brodie and Staples frequently explored the Don River valley together and young Thomson may have accompanied them. Thomson scholar Joan Murray wrote: "He [Thomson] spent much of his time on walks with his grandmother's first cousin, Dr. William Brodie, a well known entomologist, ornithologist and botanist." "Thomson also learned from Brodie how to collect specimens; as a young man, he accompanied his relative on collecting trips." Staples, who was rarely without his paintbox easel, illustrated treatises for Brodie who consulted on natural history articles written for the Telegram by Staples. Thomson, who was artistic but inexperienced, may have been intrigued by Staples, a master watercolourist, who made every effort to 'catch the light' with his quickly rendered pictures.

Researcher Angie Littlefield, who has studied Thomson's Toronto years, stated:

"Also in Brodie’s circle was Owen Staples who lived across from the Brodies on the east side of the Don River.... Staples was a founding member of the Toronto Mendelssohn Choir and a magnet for artists of all kinds. Whenever possible, Tom, who loved music, attended the choir’s concerts or gave tickets to relatives so that they too could enjoy the finest choral music Toronto had to offer. ...and Staples [was a key figure] in the intellectual life of the Brodie home and thus by extension, a major influence on Tom."

Association with the Group of Seven
A. J. Casson wrote:

<blockquote>"Owen Staples was the first professional artist I met in Toronto in 1916. I was a lad of 18 and he kindly helped to provide me with an entrée to the local art scene. I joined the Arts and Letters Club of Toronto in 1920, when Vincent Massey was president. Owen Staples was a staunch supporter of the club and very active. Many good times were spent at 69 Hogarth Avenue, in Toronto's east end, a favorite meeting place for artists, musicians, writers, etc." 

The "Studio", completed in 1904, was designed by Staples and artist C.W. Jefferys in an Arts and Crafts style. Over the years, Staples held an open house on Sundays which attracted a lively cross-section of Toronto society. Regular visitors included the artists who would become the Group of Seven and other members of the Arts and Letters Club. Visitors included opera star Bertha May Crawford, architect Eden Smith, banker and art patron Sir Byron Edmund Walker who purchased many of Staples' works, the celebrated cellist Leo Smith and a host of other artists, poets, writers, educators, ministers, musicians, politicians and bankers. Perhaps the most enigmatic visitor was William Leonard Hunt, also known as The Great Farini, who pitched a tent in the backyard and stayed for the summer. In later years, Staples' son Will and his close friend Charles Comfort attracted a younger generation of Toronto's arts community. The weekly open house gradually petered out after the untimely death of Will Staples in 1929.

Selected public collections
 Art Gallery of Ontario
 City of Toronto Archives
 Library and Archives Canada
 McCord Museum
 National Gallery of Canada
 Queen's University
 Royal Ontario Museum
 Toronto Public Library
 University of Toronto

Selected exhibitions
 1880 1st Rochester Art Club Exhibition, Rochester, New York, US
 1888-1948  Royal Canadian Academy, Toronto, Ontario
 1889-1948  Ontario Society of Artists, Toronto, Ontario
 1893  World's Columbian Exposition, Chicago, Illinois, US
 1894  California Midwinter International Exposition of 1894, San Francisco, USA
 1901  Pan-American Exposition, Buffalo, New York, US
 1904  Louisiana Purchase Exposition, St Louis, Missouri, US
 1910, 1939  Walker Art Gallery, Liverpool, UK
 1915  Panama–Pacific International Exposition, San Francisco, US
 1933-1938  The Royal Scottish Society of Painters in Watercolour, Glasgow, UK
 1939 Exhibition of Water Colours By Canadian Artists, Gloucester, UK
 1944-1945  The Exhibition of Contemporary Canadian Painting, Rio de Janeiro and São Paulo, Brazil
 1977  Royal Ontario Museum, Canadiana Gallery, Toronto, Ontario, posthumous retrospective exhibition
 1996 Owen Staples: A Retrospective, Market Gallery, Toronto, Ontario, posthumous retrospective exhibition

Book illustrations
 Robertson, John Ross. Landmarks of Toronto. Vol. 1: 1792–1893, 1894. Vol. 2: 1834–1895, 1896. Vol. 3: 1834–1898, 1898. Vol. 4: 1834–1904, 1904. Vol. 5: 1834–1908. Vol. 6: 1834–1914, 1914.
 Simcoe, Elizabeth Posthuma. The Dairy of Mrs. John Graves Simcoe. Toronto: William Briggs, 1911.
 Snider, C.H.J. The Story of the 'Nancy' and Other Eighteen-Twelvers. Toronto: McClelland & Stewart, 1926.
 Torontonensis. Yearbooks 1930–1934.
 Hathaway E.J. Jesse Ketchum and His Times. Toronto: McClelland & Stewart, 1929
 Trail, Catherine Parr. The Backwoods of Canada. Toronto: McClelland & Stewart, 1929.
 Pierce, Lorne. William Kirby: The Portrait of a Tory Loyalist. Toronto: Macmillan Company of Canada, 1929.
 Middleton, J.E. The Romance of Ontario. Toronto: Gage, 1931.
 Moore, Kathleen, and Jessie McEwen. A Picture History of Canada. Toronto: Thomas Nelson & Sons, 1942.

Notes
 A Dictionary of Canadian Artists, volumes 1-8 by Colin S. MacDonald, and volume 9 (online only), by Anne Newlands and Judith Parker
 archive.org/
 Artist's Documentation File, National Gallery of Canada Library and Archives
 Tom Thomson at The Canadian Encyclopedia, accessed September 4, 2019
 Canadian Who's Who. Vol. 2. London: Times Publishing Co., 1936
 Staples, Rod. "Owen Staples, Painter of Canada's Past". The Beaver, February–March, 1992
 Staples, Rod and Ian Galt. Owen Staples: Painter of Canada's Past. Scarborough: Hogarth Press, 1998.
 Toronto Public Library, John Ross Robertson Collection. Historicity: Toronto Then and Now, website, http://www.torontopubliclibrary.ca (accessed January 11, 2008).
 Tovell, Rosemarie L. A New Class of Art, The Artist's Print in Canadian Art, 1877–1920. Ottawa: National Gallery of Canada, 1996.

References

External links
Artwork on Digital Archive Ontario (Toronto Public Library)
Political cartoons (McCord Museum)

1866 births
1949 deaths
19th-century Canadian painters
Canadian male painters
20th-century Canadian painters
Canadian cartoonists
Canadian landscape painters
Canadian muralists
Canadian etchers
Pennsylvania Academy of the Fine Arts alumni
20th-century printmakers
19th-century Canadian male artists
20th-century Canadian male artists